Costantino Castriota Scanderbeg (1477–1500) was an Albanian nobleman from the House of Kastrioti and prelate of the Catholic Church who served as Bishop of Isernia (1497–1500).

Biography
Costantino Castriota was born in 1477 to the House of Kastrioti, the son of Gjon Kastrioti II, son of Skanderbeg, and Jerina Branković, the daughter of Serbian Despot Lazar Branković.
On 2 Oct 1497, he was appointed during the papacy of Pope Alexander VI as Bishop of Isernia. 
He served as Bishop of Isernia until his death in 1500.

References

Further reading
 (for Chronology of Bishops) 
 (for Chronology of Bishops)  

15th-century Italian Roman Catholic bishops
16th-century Italian Roman Catholic bishops
Bishops appointed by Pope Alexander VI
1477 births
1500 deaths
House of Kastrioti
Italian people of Albanian descent
Italian people of Serbian descent